The Indonesian Criminal Code (WvS), commonly known in Indonesian as Kitab Undang-Undang Hukum Pidana ( (derived from Dutch), abbreviated as KUH Pidana or KUHP), were laws and regulations that form the basis of criminal law in Indonesia. By deviating as necessary from Presidential Regulation dated 10 October 1945 No. 2, it stipulated that the criminal law regulations that are in effect are the Dutch criminal law regulations that existed on 8 March 1942. Currently, the Republic of Indonesia has its own Criminal Code.

History 
The Criminal Code, also known in Indonesian as KUHP or in Dutch as Wetboek van Strafrecht, are laws and regulations that regulate criminal acts in Indonesia. The Criminal Code that is currently in force is the Criminal Code which originates from Dutch colonial law, namely Wetboek van Strafrecht voor Nederlands-Indië. The ratification was carried out through the Staatsblad of 1915 number 732 and came into effect on 1 January 1918. After Indonesian independence from the Dutch in 1945, the Criminal Code is retained and are enforced by an alignment of conditions in the form of revocation of articles that were no longer relevant. This is based on the Transitional Provisions of Article II of the 1945 Constitution, which states that: "All existing state bodies and regulations are immediately enforced as long as new ones have not been enacted according to this Constitution." It was these provisions that later became the legal basis for the enforcement of all statutory regulations during the colonial period to the independence period.

To reaffirm the enforcement of criminal law during those colonial period, on 26 February 1946, the government then issued Law Number 1 of 1946 concerning Criminal Law Regulations. This law was then used as the legal basis for changing "Wetboek van Strafrecht voor Netherlands Indie" to "Wetboek van Strafrecht" (WvS), which became known as the Indonesian Criminal Code. Nevertheless, in Article XVII of the act, there is also a provision which states that: "This law shall take effect for the islands of Java and Madura on the day it is announced and for other regions on the day to be determined by the President." Thus, the application of Wetboek van Strafrecht voor Netherlands Indie to Wetboek van Strafrecht is only limited to the regions of Java and Madura. The enactment of the Criminal Code throughout the territory of the Republic of Indonesia was only carried out on 20 September 1958, with the promulgation of Law no. 73 of 1958 declaring the Applicability of Law Number 1 of 1946 of the Republic of Indonesia in regards to Criminal Law Regulations for the Entire Territory of the Republic of Indonesia, and thus amending the Criminal Code. As stated in Article 1 of Law no. 7 of 1958 which reads: "Law No. 1 of 1946 of the Republic of Indonesia concerning Criminal Law Regulations declared applicable to the entire territory of the Republic of Indonesia. However, from Tuesday, December 06, 2022, the latest Criminal Code Bill was passed in a plenary meeting of the House of Representatives of the Republic of Indonesia so that the Dutch Criminal Code which has been in effect since January 1, 1918 is no longer enforced in the Unitary State of the Republik of Indonesia.

Books and Chapters 
The Indonesian Criminal Code are compiled into 3 (three) books, including:
 Book I: General Circumstances (Article 1 to Article 103)
 Chapter I – General Circumstances
 Chapter II – Criminal
 Chapter III – Things that Abolish, Reduce or Aggravate Crime
 Chapter IV – Trials
 Chapter V – Involvement in Crime
 Chapter VI – Combined Criminal Acts
 Chapter VII – Filing and Withdrawing Complaints in Cases of Crimes Prosecuted for Complaints Only
 Chapter VIII – Abolishment of the Authority to Prosecute and Execute Criminals
 Chapter IX – Definition of Several Terms used in the Code
 Closing
 Book II: Crimes (Article 104 to Article 488)
 Chapter I – Crimes against State Security
 Chapter II – Crimes against the Dignity of the President and Vice President
 Chapter III – Crimes against Friendly Countries and Heads of Friendly Countries and their Representatives
 Chapter IV – Crime against Performing Duties and Rights of the State
 Chapter V – Crimes against Public Order
 Chapter VI – Combat Fighting
 Chapter VII – Crimes that endanger Public Security for Persons or Goods
 Chapter VIII – Crimes against General Authority
 Chapter IX – False Oaths and False Statements
 Chapter X – Counterfeiting of Currency and Banknotes
 Chapter XI – Counterfeiting of Stamps and Brands
 Chapter XII – Letter Forgery
 Chapter XIII – Crimes against Origin and Marriage
 Chapter XIV – Crimes against Decency
 Chapter XV – Leaving Ones who need Help
 Chapter XVI – Humiliation
 Chapter XVII – Confiding Ones Secrets
 Chapter XVIII – Crime against the Freedom of the People
 Chapter XIX – Crimes against Life
 Chapter XX – Persecution
 Chapter XXI – Causing Death or Injury through Negligence
 Chapter XXII – Theft
 Chapter XXIII – Blackmail and Threats
 Chapter XXIV – Embezzlement
 Chapter XXV – Underhanded Deeds
 Chapter XXVI – Detriment to Debtors or People who have Rights
 Chapter XXVII – Destroying or Damaging Things
 Chapter XXVIII – Crimes of Office
 Chapter XXIX – Cruise Crimes
 Chapter XXIX A – Aviation Crimes and Crimes against Aviation Facilities/Infrastructure (Law No. 4 of 1976)
 Chapter XXX – Publishing and Printing Storage
 Chapter XXXI – The Repetition of Crimes relating to Various Chapters
 Book III: Offenses (Article 489 to Article 569)
 Chapter I – Concerning Public Security Violations For Persons or Goods and Health
 Chapter II – Breach of Public Order
 Chapter III – Offenses against Common Rulers
 Chapter IV – Offenses concerning Origin and Marriage
 Chapter V – Offenses against People who need Help
 Chapter VI – Offenses of Decency
 Chapter VII – Offenses concerning Land, Plants, and Yards
 Chapter VIII – Violation of Office
 Chapter IX – Shipping Violations

Revision

Article of witchcraft 
Article 293 of the Draft Criminal Code reads:

Criminal law expert Barda Nawawi Arief, who took part in drafting the policy, said that this article is an extension of Article 162 of the Criminal Code which regulates the prohibition of assisting in criminal acts, which reads "Anyone who publicly orally or in writing offers to provide information, opportunity, or means to commit a criminal act, shall be punished with imprisonment for a maximum of 9 months or a fine of up to Rp. 400,500."

Although political figure Eva Sundari of the PDI-P party thinks that the law will find it difficult to prove someone has the power of witchcraft, so much so that this article is prone to criminalization, criminal law expert from the University of Indonesia, Andi Hamzah, says that the proof does not require the pleader to bring a supernatural experts or priest, but to only bring witnesses who hear that someone claims to be capable of practicing witchcraft.

The pros and cons of the witchcraft act have appeared since the 1990s. Because of this, to deepened the understanding of the article on witchcraft, the People's Representative Council (DPR) conducted a comparative study to the Netherlands, the United Kingdom, France, and Russia.

Withdrawal 
On 6 December 2022, the Indonesian Parliament voted to approve a new criminal code for Indonesia on the basis of decolonization, which repeals the old criminal code and its amendments. Initially, the new code was supposed to pass in 2019, yet amid a mass street demonstration across the country, the process was ultimately halted as the Indonesian President Joko Widodo had asked Parliament to revise problematic clauses. The protest comes as the new criminal code introduced some controversial new laws, such as banning unmarried couple to cohabit; banning the defamation of the president, government ministers and agencies; banning of demonstration without notice; the witchcraft act (article 252); the privacy act (article 412), etc. Some human right experts has even called it: "a step backward in Indonesian democracy".

The new penal code contains 624 articles, which the government claimed it had spent the past years gathering feedback from stakeholders, experts and the public following a nationwide protest against the code in 2019. The new code, which applies to Indonesians and foreigners alike, will not take immediate effect, but instead, three years after the bill is enacted into law, in which opponents can file requests for judicial review of the code to the Constitutional Court.

See also
Indonesian criminal procedure

References

Crime in Indonesia
Criminal codes
Law of Indonesia